In organic chemistry, alkanolamines (amino alcohols) are organic compounds that contain both hydroxyl and amino (and ) functional groups on an alkane backbone. Most alkanolamines are colorless.

1-Aminoalcohols
1-Aminoalcohols are better known as hemiaminals.  Methanolamine is the simplest member.

2-Aminoalcohols
2-Aminoalcohols are an important class of organic compounds that are often generated by the reaction of amines with epoxides:

Simple alkanolamines are used as solvents, synthetic intermediates, and high-boiling bases.

Hydrogenation or hydride reduction of amino acids gives the corresponding 2-aminoalcohols. Examples include prolinol (from proline), valinol (from valine), tyrosinol (from tyrosine).

Key members: ethanolamine, dimethylethanolamine, N-methylethanolamine, Aminomethyl propanol. Two popular drugs, often called alkanolamine beta blockers, are members of this structural class: propranolol, pindolol.  Isoetarine is yet another medicinally useful derivative of ethanolamine.

1,3-, 1,4-, and 1,5-amino alcohols
 Heptaminol, a cardiac stimulant
 Propanolamines

Natural products 
Most proteins and peptides contain both alcohols and amino groups. Two amino acids are alkanolamines, formally speaking: serine and hydroxyproline.
 Veratridine and veratrine
 Tropane alkaloids such as atropine
 hormones and neurotransmitters epinephrine (adrenaline) and norepinephrine (noradrenaline)

References

External links
 

Alcohols
Amines